The Voice, is a 1982 Soviet psychological drama film. It is based on the screenplay of the same name by Natalya Ryazantseva and directed by Ilya Averbakh. This is the last film by director Ilya Averbakh.

Plot
Actress Yulia Martynova (Natalya Sayko) is starring in a new film, but in the middle of the film production she is suddenly hospitalized with a serious illness. The film director (Leonid Filatov) is emotionally involved; he becomes frustrated, but the actress comes back from her hospital bed to the studio to continue her work in post-production. Yulia cannot imagine her character speaking with the voice of another actress, so she deals with her condition, taking drugs to overcome her pain, in order to contribute her original voice to the film. The cast and crew members help the star to overcome, and her original voice brings new depth and meaning to the film after her death.

Cast
Natalya Sayko as Yulia Martynova
 Leonid Filatov as Film director
Grigori Kalatozishvili as Writer
Yelizaveta Nikishchikhina  as Anna Viktorova
Vsevolod Shilovsky as Cameraman 
Sergei Bekhterev as Composer
Petr Shelokhonov as Production director
Vasili Bochkarev as Arkady
Yelena Safonova as Sveta
Tatyana Kravchenko as Nadya
Tatyana Pankova as art director
Georgy Berezovsky as sound technician
Tatyana Lavrova as Akhtyrskaya
Mikhail Gluzsky as Pavel Platonovich
Tatyana Rodionova as Film editor
Alla Osipenko as Yulia's neighbor
Boris Eifman as cameo
Andrei Urgant as episode
Nina Usatova as episode

Production
The film was produced by Lenfilm studios in Leningrad (St. Petersburg), Russia, former USSR. Filming locations were in the city of Leningrad (St. Petersburg) and its suburbs, as well as in Moscow. Post-production was done at Lenfilm studios. Production dates were from October 1980 to October 1982.

Reception
Attendance was 2.3 million viewers internationally in the first year after release. The film was released in East Germany on 28 October 1983, with narration and subtitles in German.

Facts and connections
The original director's cut was 93 minutes; currently available copies are reduced to 87 min.
This was the first Soviet film openly dealing with drug and alcohol abuse among Soviet actors, alluding to artists struggling with the system. The title, Golos (meaning 'voice'), has allusion to the voice of Vladimir Vysotsky, a dissident star actor and singer who died at age 42, in 1980. Director Ilya Averbakh knew Vysotsky, so the film Golos was made to support those with independent mind and voice.
Director Ilya Averbakh died aged 51, three years after the film was released.
Director Ilya Averbakh was a medical doctor, before he became a film director, so he had additional professional knowledge and understanding about stress and pressures on independent minds in the Soviet Union.
The film Golos was released after the death of Leonid Brezhnev when KGB chief Yuri Andropov came to power in the Soviet Union.

References

External links 

 Film "Die Stimme" cast and synopsis  (German)

1982 films
1982 in the Soviet Union
Soviet romantic drama films
Russian romantic drama films
1982 romantic drama films
1980s Russian-language films
Films directed by Ilya Averbakh
Films about actors